Kashibai was the first wife of Bajirao I, the Peshwa (Prime Minister) to the fourth Maratha Chhatrapati (Emperor) Shahu. With Bajirao, she had four children, including Balaji Baji Rao and Ragunath Rao. Balaji succeeded Bajirao as Peshwa upon the latter's death in 1740. Also following Bajirao's death, Kashibai fostered her step-son, Shamsher Bahadur, whose mother was Bajirao's second wife, Mastani.

Family
Kashibai was the daughter of Mahadji Krishna Joshi and Bhabanibai of Chas, belonging to a wealthy banker family. She was fondly called "Laadubai" and was born and raised in Chaaskaman village, which is located 70 kilometers away from Pune. Kashibai's father, Mahadji Krishna Joshi, was originally from Talsure village in Ratnagiri and later shifted to Chaaskaman. Mahadji was a wealthy sahukar (moneylender) as well as the subedar of the Maratha empire in Kalyan, a factor which played a strong role in the alliance of Bajirao and Kashibai. Mahadji had also helped the reigning Maratha emperor (Chhatrapati) Shahu in his difficulties and as a reward was appointed as his treasurer. Kashibai also had a brother named Krishnarao Chaskar.

According to historian Pandurang Balkawade, Kashibai was quiet and soft-spoken and suffered from a type of arthritis.

Marriage
Kashibai was married to Bajirao I on March 11, 1720, in a household ceremony at Saswad. The marriage was a happy one and Bajirao was essentially monogamous by nature and the family tradition.  Kashibai and Bajirao had four sons together. Balaji Baji Rao (nicknamed "Nanasaheb"), was born in 1720 and was later appointed Peshwa by Shahu in 1740 after Bajirao's death. Their second son Ramchandra died young. Their third son Raghunath Rao (nicknamed "Raghoba") served as the Peshwa during 1773–1774 while their fourth son Janardhan Rao also died young. Since mostly male members of the Peshwa family were out on the battlefield, Kashibai controlled the day-to-day running of the empire, especially of Pune. And it was possible because of her social nature.

Bajirao took a second wife, Mastani, the daughter of Hindu king Chhatrasal of Bundelkhand from his Muslim wife. However, this marriage was not accepted by the Bhat family. Kashibai is also noted to have not played any role in the household war waged by the Peshwa family against Mastani. Historian Pandurang Balkawade notes that various historical documents suggest that she was ready to accept Mastani as Bajirao's second wife, but could not do so going against her mother-in-law Radhabai and brother-in-law Chimaji Appa

As the Brahmins of Pune boycotted the Peshwa family due to Bajirao's relations with Mastani, Chimaji Appa and Nanasaheb resolved to force the separation of Bajirao and Mastani in early 1740.

Bajirao's death
While Bajirao was out of Pune on expedition, Mastani was put under house arrest. Nanasaheb had sent his mother Kashibai to meet Bajirao. Kashibai is said to have served him on his deathbed as a loyal and dutiful wife and has been described as highly devoted to her husband. She and her son Janardhan performed the last rites.

Mastani died in 1740 soon after Bajirao's death and then Kashibai took care of their son Shamsher Bahadur and made facilities to train him in weaponry. She became more religious after her husband's death. She performed various pilgrimages and stayed in Banaras for four years. On one such tour she was accompanied with 10,000 pilgrims and had expenditure of rupees one lakh. Returning from a pilgrimage in July 1747, she commissioned a temple dedicated to Shiva in her hometown Chas naming it Someshwar Temple. Built in 1749, the temple stands on a  land and is popular for Tripurari Poornima celebrations and finds mention in the Marathi book Sahali Ek Divasyachya Parisaraat Punyachya as a tourist spot near Pune.

In popular culture
Shrimant Peshwin Kashibai is a historical marathi novel based on Kashibai’s life written by author Ashwini Kulkarni.
Kashibai features in Raau, the 1972 fictional historical novel by Nagnath S. Inamdar.
Kashibai is a principal character in Ram Sivasankaran's novel The Peshwa: The Lion and the Stallion (2015).
A fictional version of Kashibai (based on Nagnath S. Inamdar's novel Raau) was portrayed by Priyanka Chopra in the 2015 film Bajirao Mastani directed by Sanjay Leela Bhansali.
Ishita Ganguly portrayed Kashibai in Sony TV's 2017 historical drama show Peshwa Bajirao.
 Aarohi Patel played the younger Kashi, while Riya Sharma portrays the adult version in Zee TV's 2021 historical drama show Kashibai Bajirao Ballal.

References

External links 

Marathi people
Women of the Maratha Empire
Indian female royalty
18th-century Indian royalty
Indian Hindus
1758 deaths
1703 births